The men's sprint event was part of the track cycling programme at the 1924 Summer Olympics. The field consisted of 31 cyclists from 17 countries. The Vélodrome de Vincennes track was a  loop. The event was won by Lucien Michard of France, the nation's third victory in the men's sprint. His teammate Jean Cugnot earned bronze. Jacob Meijer of the Netherlands took silver, putting the Dutch team on the podium for the second consecutive Games.

Background

This was the fifth appearance of the event, which has been held at every Summer Olympics except 1904 and 1912. The only returning semifinalist from 1920 was gold medal winner Maurice Peeters of the Netherlands. Peeters had also won the Grand Prix de Paris in 1920. He was one of the favorites along with William Fenn of the United States and 1923 World Champion Jean Cugnot of France.

Argentina, Bulgaria, Chile, Czechoslovakia, Hungary, Latvia, Poland, and Switzerland each made their debut in the men's sprint. France made its fifth appearance, the only nation to have competed at every appearance of the event.

Competition format

There were 12 first-round heats, with up to three cyclists in each. The top cyclist in each heat advanced to the quarterfinals (12 cyclists), while all other finishers went to the first repechage (18 cyclists, with one man eliminated because he did not finish his heat). In the first repechage, there were six heats of three cyclists each, with the winners advancing to the quarterfinals (6 cyclists, joining the 12 already qualified) and everyone else eliminated. The 18 quarterfinalists were divided into six heats of three cyclists each. The winner advanced directly to the semifinals (6 cyclists), while the other cyclists went to a second repechage (12 cyclists). The second repechage featured three heats of four cyclists each, with the winners advancing to the semifinals (3 cyclists, joining the 6 already qualified) and all others eliminated. The semifinals were three heats of three cyclists each, with winners advancing to the three-man final and others eliminated.

Records

The records for the sprint are 200 metre flying time trial records, kept for the qualifying round in later Games as well as for the finish of races.

* World records were not tracked by the UCI until 1954.

No new Olympic record was set during the competition.

Schedule

Results

Source:

Round 1

The top finisher in each heat qualified for the quarterfinals. All other cyclists went to the first repechage for a second chance at quarterfinal qualifying.

Heat 1

Heat 2

Heat 3

Heat 4

Heat 5

Heat 6

Heat 7

Heat 8

Heat 9

Heat 10

Heat 11

Heat 12

First repechage

First repechage heat 1

First repechage heat 2

First repechage heat 3

First repechage heat 4

First repechage heat 5

First repechage heat 6

Quarterfinals

The 18 winners of the first round and first repechage competed in the quarterfinals. Again, the winner of each heat advanced (this time to the semifinals) while the other cyclists competed in another repechage.

Quarterfinal 1

Quarterfinal 2

Quarterfinal 3

Quarterfinal 4

Quarterfinal 5

Quarterfinal 6

Second repechage

Second repechage heat 1

Second repechage heat 2

Second repechage heat 3

Semifinals

The nine remaining cyclists competed in three semifinals, with the winners advancing to the finals and the losers eliminated.

Semifinal 1

Semifinal 2

Semifinal 3

Final

The final three cyclists competed for the three medals.

References

Men's sprint
Cycling at the Summer Olympics – Men's sprint